Sir William Barrott Montfort Bird (11 July 1855 – 13 November 1950) was a British solicitor and briefly a Conservative politician.

The son of William Frederic Wratislaw Bird, of Wilmington in Kent, he was educated at Bruce Castle School and admitted as a solicitor 1880. He was a director of Williams Deacon's Bank, and of other companies, and was Justice of the Peace for West Sussex. In 1895 he married Margaret Elizabeth, daughter of Henry Spencer, and widow of James H. Murray.

He was elected unopposed as Member of Parliament for Chichester at a by-election in April 1921 following the resignation of the sitting Conservative MP Lord Edmund Bernard Talbot, who had been appointed as Lord Lieutenant of Ireland.

At the 1922 general election, Bird was re-elected with a massive majority over his only opponent, a Labour Party candidate. However, he faced a Liberal Party opponent for the first time at the 1923 general election, and lost his seat. He did not stand for Parliament again.

References

External links 

1855 births
1950 deaths
Conservative Party (UK) MPs for English constituencies
People educated at Bruce Castle School
UK MPs 1918–1922
UK MPs 1922–1923
People from Wilmington, Kent